Frederiksberg is a part of the Capital Region of Denmark. It is formally an independent municipality, Frederiksberg Municipality, separate from Copenhagen Municipality, but both are a part of the City of Copenhagen. It occupies an area of less than 9 km2 and had a population of 103,192 in 2015.

Frederiksberg is an enclave surrounded by Copenhagen Municipality. Some sources ambiguously refer to Frederiksberg as a quarter or neighbourhood of Copenhagen, being one of the four municipalities that constitute the City of Copenhagen (the other three being Copenhagen, Tårnby and Dragør). However, Frederiksberg has its own mayor and municipal council, and is fiercely independent.

Frederiksberg is an affluent area, characterised by its many green spaces such as the Frederiksberg Gardens, Søndermarken, and Hostrups Have. Some institutions and locations that are widely considered to be part of Copenhagen are actually located in Frederiksberg. For example, Copenhagen Zoo as well as several stations of the Copenhagen Metro (the stations Forum, Frederiksberg, Fasanvej, Lindevang, Flintholm, Axel Møllers Have, and Frederiksberg Allé) are located in Frederiksberg. The Copenhagen S-train system also has several stations in Frederiksberg, including Peter Bangs Vej station and Flintholm station.

History

The term is known from the Snoldelev rune stone. In Beowulf, Unferth holds the same title. In Håvamål, Odin himself is referred to as "the old thul". Thula translates as "song", like in the Rigsthula poem from the Edda. By 1443 the name Tulehøj was spelled Tulleshøy. It was regarded as Copenhagen's border to the west. People have lived in the area since the Bronze Age.

The history of Frederiksberg goes back to 2 June 1651 when King Frederik III gave 20 Danish-Dutch peasants the rights to settle at Allégade (from the words allé (tree-lined street) and gade (street)), and founded the town then named "Ny Amager" (New Amager) or "Ny Hollænderby" (New Dutchman-town). Farming was not very successful, and in 1697 most of the town burned down. This meant that the peasants were unable to pay taxes, and the land reverted to the crown by Frederik III's son Christian V.

In 1700–1703, King Frederik IV built a palace on top of the hill known as Valby Bakke (bakke = hill). He named the palace Frederichs Berg, and the rebuilt town at the foot of the hill consequently changed its name to Frederiksberg. A number of the local houses were bought by wealthy citizens of Copenhagen who did not farm the land, but rather used the properties as country houses.

The town changed slowly from a farming community to a merchant town, with craftsmen and merchants. During the summer rooms were offered for rent, and restaurants served food to the people of Copenhagen who had left the cramped city for the open land, and to be near the royals.

Initially the town grew slowly with population growing from 1,000 in 1770, to 1,200 in 1800, and to 3,000 in 1850.

In 1852, Parliament removed restrictions which prohibited permanent construction outside Copenhagen's city walls. Almost immediately numerous residential areas were constructed, starting in the eastern part near Copenhagen, and ending in the western part farthest away from Copenhagen in 1950. This led to rapid population growth; in 1900 the population reached 80,000, and in 1950 Frederiksberg peaked with a population of 120,000.

Today Frederiksberg consists almost entirely of 3- to 5-story residential houses, large single-family homes, and large parks; only a few small areas with light industry remain.

Geography

Frederiksberg, which lies west of central Copenhagen, is completely surrounded by boroughs forming part of the city of Copenhagen – the result of an expansion of the Copenhagen Municipality's boundary in 1901, which nevertheless did not include Frederiksberg in the list of municipalities to be incorporated in the enlarged area. Frederiksberg is thus effectively a municipal island within the country's capital – a unique phenomenon in present-day Europe. Other than administratively, however, it is largely indistinguishable in character from the districts of Copenhagen city which surround it.

Frederiksberg has several stations on the Copenhagen Metro system, and is home to the tallest residential structure in Denmark and the second tallest residential building in Scandinavia: the 102-metre high Domus Vista.

Culture
The Danmark Rundt cycling race traditionally finishes on Frederiksberg Alle, often in a sprint finish.

Education
Frederiksberg houses the University of Copenhagen's Frederiksberg Campus, Copenhagen Business School, 9 public schools (run by the municipality), 3 private schools, 1 technical college, and more.

The Lycée Français Prins Henrik, a French international school, is in Frederiksberg.

Shopping
The 3 streets Gammel Kongevej, Godthåbsvej, and Falkoner Alle are the busiest shopping streets. The town also houses the Frederiksberg Centret shopping mall.

Main sights
 Frederiksberg Campus (University of Copenhagen)
 Frederiksberg Gardens
 Frederiksberg Hospital
 Frederiksberg Palace
 Frederiksberg Town Hall
 Copenhagen Business School
 Copenhagen Zoo
 Royal Danish Military Academy

Demography

Transport

The town is served by the Frederiksberg station and the Fasanvej station, opened in 2003 on the Copenhagen Metro. It serves the M1, M2 and M3 (the City Circle Line) lines and is connected with bus services.

The S-Train urban rail and suburban rail network can be reached through Peter Bangs Vej station, Fuglebakken station and Grøndal station.

Notable people

Arts and writing

Kamma Rahbek (1775–1829), artist, salonist and lady of letters
Asger Hamerik (1843–1923), composer of classical music
Marie Luplau (1848–1925), artist and educator, active in the women's movement
Axel Olrik (1864–1917), folklorist and scholar of mediaeval historiography
Marie Krøyer (1867–1940), painter
Frederik Lange (1871–1941), painter
Harald Giersing (1881–1927), painter, buried here
Robert Storm Petersen (1882–1949), cartoonist, writer, animator, painter and humorist
Gerda Wegener (1886–1940), illustrator and painter, art nouveau and later art deco
Einar Utzon-Frank (1888–1955), sculptor and academic
Mogens Wöldike (1897–1988), conductor, choirmaster, organist and scholar
Gottfred Eickhoff (1902–1982), sculptor
Helen Schou (1905–2006), sculptor most known for her works of horses.
Victor Brockdorff (1911–1992), painter who joined the Odsherred Painters 
Erik Christian Haugaard (1923–2009), American writer of children's books
Leif Panduro (1923–1977), writer, novelist and dramatist
Bent Fabric (1924–2020), composer and pianist
Frank Jæger (1926–1977), writer of poetry and radio plays
Anders Bodelsen (born 1937), writer
Claus Bjørn (1944–2005), author, historian and broadcaster
Roald Als (born 1948), cartoonist
Esben Holmboe Bang (born 1982), chef and owner of three Michelin star restaurant Maaemo

Acting and entertainment

Carl Theodor Dreyer (1889–1968), film director
Ib Mossin (1933–2004), actor, singer, director and heartthrob 
Birgitte Price (1934–1997), actress
Bo Christensen (1937–2020), film producer
Jesper Langberg (born 1940), actor
Jørgen de Mylius (born 1946), radio and TV personality
Louise Frevert (born 1953), belly dancer, pornographic actress and MP 2001–2007
Claes Bang (born 1967), actor and musician 
Sofie Gråbøl (born 1968), actress
Christina Chanée (born 1979), Danish-Thai pop singer, lives here

Politics and public office

Carl Christian Hall (1812–1888), statesman and twice Council President of Denmark
Viggo Kampmann (1910–1976), Prime Minister of Denmark 1960–1962
Emil Balslev (1913–1944), surveyor and member of the Danish resistance 
Torben Tryde (1916–1998), lieutenant colonel, writer, Olympian and resistance fighter
Per Stig Møller (born 1942), politician, a member of the Folketing 1984–2015, held several ministerial posts 
Hans Hækkerup (1945–2013), politician, member of parliament and Minister of Defence 
Erland Kolding Nielsen (1947–2017), Director General and CEO of the Danish Royal Library
Lars Barfoed (born 1957), politician, Conservative People's Party leader 2011–2014
Pia Gjellerup (born 1959), politician, Member of Folketinget and solicitor
Christian Friis Bach (born 1966), the Secretary General of the Danish Refugee Council
Ida Auken (born 1978), politician and member of Parliament
Jeanette Oppenheim (born 1952), member of the Copenhagen City Council and MEP

Science and design

Ferdinand Meldahl (1827–1908), architect
Knud Andersen (1867–1918), zoologist
Kaare Klint (1888–1954), architect and father of modern Danish furniture design
Ole Wanscher (1903–1985), furniture designer
Finn Juhl (1912–1989), architect, interior and industrial designer and introduced Danish Modern to America
Peter Naur (1928–2016), computer science pioneer
Per Brinch Hansen (1938–2007), Danish-American computer scientist
Bent Skovmand (1945–2007), plant scientist and conservationist

Sport

Charles Winckler (1867–1932), athlete, Olympic champion
Christian Grøthan (1890–1951), footballer
Ebbe Schwartz (1901–1964), football administrator
Pauli Jørgensen (1905–1993), football player and manager
Torben Ulrich (born 1928), tennis player and writer
Per Lyngemark (1941–2010), track cyclist, Olympic champion
Per Røntved (born 1949), footballer
Ivan Nielsen (born 1956), footballer
Kent Nielsen (born 1961), football player and manager
Jan Bartram (born 1962), footballer
Michael Laudrup (born 1964), footballer
Søren Colding (born 1972), footballer
Thomas Delaney (born 1991), footballer
Cecilie Uttrup Ludwig (born 1995), road cyclist
Rasmus Winther (born 1999), gamer

Twin towns
Frederiksberg practices twinning on the municipal level. For the twin towns, see twin towns of Frederiksberg Municipality.

References

External links

Frederiksberg official website

Municipal seats in the Capital Region of Denmark
Municipal seats of Denmark
Copenhagen metropolitan area
Cities and towns in the Capital Region of Denmark